Astronomia.pl was a Polish portal about astronomy and space research created in 2001 and worked until 2015. It was the largest portal about astronomy and space in Poland in the years of its activity, and it was reaching 100 000 users monthly. The portal hosted over 3000 articles. The full name of Astronomia.pl was Polish Astronomy Portal (Polski Portal Astronomiczny in Polish). The website was run in Polish, however a small part of it was also in English.

History 
In 2003 the website was awarded Honourable Patronage of the Polish Association of Astronomy Amateurs. In 2004/2005 the portal edited a TV program entitled "Astronomy Magazine" (in Polish: "Magazyn Astronomia") broadcast by TVN Meteo channel. In 2006 the website was awarded a prize in the "Science Communicator" contest (in Polish: "Popularyzator Nauki"), organized by the Ministry of Science and Higher Education and "Science in Poland" of the Polish Press Agency.

Characteristics 
Features provided by the portal included: daily news bulletin, database of articles, gallery of images, discussion forum, virtual library of master's theses, English-Polish astronomical dictionary, newsletter, RSS channels, among others. Astronomia.pl also published a news bulletin in English, which included translations of articles concerning Polish amateur and professional astronomy.

Astronomia.pl also included other sites devoted to astronomy, such as Kopernik.pl, containing biographies of astronomers, Planetarium.pl, about all Polish planetaria, and AstroWWW.pl, which hosted quality websites created and run by astronomy amateurs.

The portal supported various astronomical initiatives, cooperates with educational organizations, institutions and book publishers. It also organised various quizzes and contests.

References

External links
 List of articles in which Astronomia.pl is cited by the Polish Press Agency "Science in Poland" service (in Polish)

Web portals
Astronomy websites
Polish science websites